is a district located in Shiribeshi Subprefecture, Hokkaido, Japan.

As of 2004, the district has an estimated population of 7,316 and a density of 16.60 persons per km2. The total area is 440.83 km2.

Towns
Kuromatsunai
Suttsu

Districts in Hokkaido